Beth Maitland (born May 12, 1958) is an American actress who is best known for her portrayal of Traci Abbott in the CBS Daytime soap opera The Young and the Restless from 1982 to 1996 & since 2001 on a recurring basis. She also stars as Gloria on The Grove: The Series created by Crystal Chappell.

Biography

Early life
Born in Rapid City, South Dakota, Maitland and her family moved to Scottsdale, Arizona when she was seven. By age thirteen, she had already appeared in numerous community theatre and dinner theatre productions. She attended Arizona State University, majoring in music and theatre. Maitland moved to Los Angeles in 1978 and worked in night clubs while taking acting classes at the Los Angeles Film Industry Workshop.

Career
On television, Maitland has appeared in several made-for-television movies, and a supporting role in Mr. Holland's Opus. She is active in a Los Angeles theater company, and currently does voice over work, radio plays, and appears live with the Santa Clarita Playhouse.

Partial filmography

Awards and nominations
 Won, Daytime Emmy Outstanding Actress in a Supporting Role in a Daytime Drama Series (1985)
 Nominated, Soap Opera Digest Award Outstanding Young Leading Actress on a Daytime Serial (1986)
 Nominated, Daytime Emmy Award Outstanding Actress in a Supporting Role in a drama series, 2019.

References

External links
 

1958 births
Living people
American soap opera actresses
People from Rapid City, South Dakota
Actresses from Scottsdale, Arizona
Actresses from South Dakota
Arizona State University alumni
Daytime Emmy Award for Outstanding Supporting Actress in a Drama Series winners
21st-century American women